Tunkhannock Township is the name of some places in the U.S. state of Pennsylvania:

Tunkhannock Township, Monroe County, Pennsylvania
Tunkhannock Township, Wyoming County, Pennsylvania

Pennsylvania township disambiguation pages